|}

The Carnarvon Stakes is a Listed flat horse race in Great Britain open to horses aged three years only.
It is run at Newbury over a distance of 6 furlongs (1,207 metres), and it is scheduled to take place each year in May.

The race was run as the Hue-Williams Stakes in the eighties and early nineties and was contested by good horses such as Dayjur (beaten a head by Tod in 1990), Dancing Dissident (winner of the Group 2 Temple Stakes on next run) and Shalford (later winner of three Group 3 races over 6 furlongs).  
Subsequent runnings had a variety of names until the race was given its present name and awarded Listed status in 2002.

Winners since 1988

See also 
 Horse racing in Great Britain
 List of British flat horse races

References
 Paris-Turf:
, 
Racing Post:

Flat races in Great Britain
Newbury Racecourse
Flat horse races for three-year-olds